The ECAC Hockey Player of the Year is an annual award given out at the conclusion of the ECAC Hockey regular season to the best player in the conference as voted by the coaches of each ECAC team.

The Player of the Year was first awarded in 1962 and every year thereafter.

Four players (Bob Brinkworth, Scott Fusco, Chase Polacek and Jimmy Vesey) have received the award two separate times, each doing so in consecutive years. The award has been split twice in its history, 2002–03 and 2013–14.

Award winners

Winners by school

Winners by position

See also
ECAC Hockey Awards

References

General

Specific

External links
ECAC Hockey Awards (Incomplete)

College ice hockey trophies and awards in the United States